Combinatio nova, abbreviated comb. nov. (sometimes n. comb.), is Latin for "new combination". It is used in taxonomic biology literature when a new name is introduced based on a pre-existing name.

There are three situations:

 the taxon is moved to a different genus
 an infraspecific taxon is moved to a different species
 the rank of the taxon is changed.

Examples

See also
 Glossary of scientific naming
 Basionym
 List of Latin phrases
 Nomenclature code

References

External links
 Basonyms, new combinations - bacterio.cict.fr.

Botanical nomenclature
Zoological nomenclature